As If is the sixth studio album by American dance-punk group !!!, released on October 16, 2015, on Warp Records.

Singles
Three official singles have been released from As If: "All U Writers", a -minute (5 minutes on the album) long song featuring vocals from Teresa Eggers, released 28 April 2015. "Freedom '15", a groovy leviathan of a disco track, released 30 July 2015, and features vocals from Yolanda Harris Dancy and Taletha Manor. A lyric video for "Freedom '15" was uploaded 20 August 2015. The third single from the album, "Bam City", was released 30 September 2015, with an accompanying music video. "Ooo", a grooving love song, was released with an accompanying music video on November 16, 2015.

Promotional singles
One promotional single has been released from the As If: "Sick Ass Moon", an "R&B-tinted house track", released with "Freedom '15" on 30 July 2015.

Critical reception

In a positive review for Exclaim!, Daniel Sylvester called the album "one of the most enjoyable, if schizophrenic, dance albums of the year."

Track listing

Personnel
 Rafael Cohen – vocals, guitars, keyboards
 Nic Offer – vocals, keyboards
 Mario Andreoni – guitar, keyboards
 Allan Wilson – saxophone, keyboards, percussion, background vocals
 Daniel Gorman – keyboards, background vocals
 Paul Quattrone – drums
 Heba Kadry – mastering

Charts

References

2015 albums
!!! albums
Warp (record label) albums